Doug Goldsby (born December 23, 1986, in Sacramento, California) is a former professional Canadian football safety. He most recently played for the BC Lions of the Canadian Football League. He was signed by the Montreal Alouettes as an undrafted free agent in 2009, where he spent a season before being picked up by the Lions in 2010. He played CIS football for the UBC Thunderbirds.

External links
BC Lions bio

1986 births
Living people
Players of Canadian football from British Columbia
Canadian football defensive backs
UBC Thunderbirds football players
Montreal Alouettes players